KLUN (103.1 FM) is a commercial radio station that is licensed to Paso Robles, California and serves the San Luis Obispo, California area. The station is owned by Radio Lazer and airs a regional Mexican music format.

History
The station first signed on in August 1995 as KNCR-FM with an adult contemporary (AC) music format. It was launched by Andy J. Fakas, who purchased the station's Federal Communications Commission (FCC) construction permit from original holder Jean Yang in 1993. On August 22, 1997, Sarape Communications Inc., headed by Fakas, changed the call sign of KNCR-FM to KBZX. The station was also simulcast on sister station KZBK (94.1 FM) in Oceano, California.

In November 1998, Sarape Communications sold KBZX and KBZK to Moon Broadcasting Paso Robles LLC, a Los Angeles-based ownership group led by Abel A. de Luna, for $750,000. The following April, the new owner ended the simulcast and flipped each station to separate Spanish-language formats. KBZX changed its call sign to KLUN and adopted a Spanish AC format branded as "Radio Tequila". In June 2000, Lazer Broadcasting purchased KLUN and its sister station, now called KLMM, from Moon Broadcasting for $1.15 million.

References

External links

LUN
LUN
Mass media in San Luis Obispo County, California
Paso Robles, California
Companies based in San Luis Obispo County, California
Radio stations established in 1995
1995 establishments in California